Puerto Vilelas  is a village and municipality in Chaco Province, in northern Argentina.

References

Populated places in Chaco Province